Cerro Morales is the highest peak in the municipality of Utuado, raising to 3,214 feet (980 m) above sea level. The mountain is shared by the municipalities of Utuado, in the barrio of Tetuán, and Jayuya, in the barrio of Jayuya Abajo. The mountain is considered a geographical landmark as it can be observed from many places in Utuado.

References 

Mountains of Puerto Rico
Geography of Puerto Rico
Utuado, Puerto Rico
Jayuya, Puerto Rico